Paul Mathiesen may refer to:

Pål Mathiesen (born 1977, also known as Athera), Norwegian musician
Paul Maitla (1913–1945, birth name Paul Mathiesen), Estonian military commander

See also
Paul Matheson (disambiguation)